Paruyr Sevak (January 24, 1924 – June 17, 1971) was an Armenian poet, translator and literary critic. He is considered one of the greatest Armenian poets of the 20th century.

Biography
Sevak was born Paruyr Ghazaryan in Chanakhchi (now Zangakatun) village, Armenian SSR, Soviet Union to Rafael Soghomonyan and Anahit Soghomonyan on January 24, 1924. Young Paruyr attended the village school. Sevak spent the part of his childhood and adolescence in a location called Navchalu yayla (near Zangakatun) and in his early writings, he signed his writings with ‘Navchalu’ as the location where they were written. Later in 1940 moved to Yerevan to study at the philological faculty of Yerevan State University. He graduated from the YSU in 1945. The same year he starts a postgraduate study of Armenian literature at the Academy of Sciences Abeghyan Institute of Literature. In 1951 Sevak went to Moscow to study at the Gorky Institute of World Literature. Graduating from that institute Paruyr works there in 1957-59 as a translating professor.

Inspired by the Western Armenian poet Ruben Sevak, Paruyr Ghazaryan adopted the name Paruyr Sevak as his pen name.

In 1960 Sevak returns to Yerevan and starts his fecund and meaningful literary, scientific and public activism. He starts to work at the Abeghyan Institute of Literature as a scientific researcher. From 1966-1971 Sevak served as the Secretary of the Board of the Writers Union of Armenia.

In 1967 Sevak became a doctor of philology after dissertation defense. In 1968 he was elected to the Supreme Council of the Armenian SSR.

Sevak died on June 17, 1971 in a car crash while on a drive back to Yerevan. In previous years, he had voiced his criticism of the corruption of the Soviet establishment and for this, many Armenians believe, he was murdered by the Soviet government. His wife, Nelly Menagharishvili, also died in the car crash. He was buried in the backyard of his home, in Zangakatun, which later became a museum open to everyone.

Literary work
Sevak's poem The Unsilenceable Belfry is dedicated to Armenian composer Komitas Vardapet and to the remembrance of the Armenian genocide.

Publications 
 Immortals Command (Անմահները հրամայում են) — 1948
 Uncompromising Intimacy (Անհաշտ մտերմություն) — 1953
 Love's Road (Սիրո ճանապարհ) — 1954
 Let There Be Light (Եղիցի լույս) — 1969
 Your Acquaintances (Ձեր ծանոթները) — 1971

Legacy and memory

One of the mains streets of Yerevan's Kanaker-Zeytun district is named after Sevak. School #123 of Yerevan is named after Paruyr Sevak.

On 2018, the third series of Dram banknotes were printed, featuring Sevak on the 1000 Dram note.

In popular culture
 "Paruyr Sevak" (1984) directed by Levon Mkrtchyan, Armenfilm

References

External links
 Paruyr Sevak's biography
 Paruyr Sevak
 Paruyr Sevak
 Paruyr Sevak's poems translated in English on Goodreads
 Sevak`s poetries audio version

1924 births
1971 deaths
20th-century Armenian poets
Soviet Armenians
Soviet poets
Road incident deaths in Armenia
Road incident deaths in the Soviet Union
Yerevan State University alumni
People from Ararat Province